Three ships of the French Navy have been named Dixmude, in honour of the Fusiliers Marins at the battle of Diksmuide:
 , an airship, formerly the German LZ 114, lost at sea on 21 December 1923
 , an aircraft carrier, formerly HMS Biter
 , the third French 

French Navy ship names